Laila Miranda Garin (born 17 February 1978) is a Brazilian actress and singer.

Biography
Garin was born in Salvador, Bahia, the daughter of a French father and a Brazilian mother. She graduated in performing arts from the Federal University of Bahia.

Career 
In the 2013 biographic musical "Elis, A Musical", directed by Dennis Carvalho, Laila delivered a standout performance in the epinonimous role of the famous Brazilian singer Elis Regina.

Following a period with Théâtre du Soleil in Paris, Laila worked in "Grease" in São Paulo and went to Rio de Janeiro in 2009, where she starred in the show "Eu te amo mesmo assim", directed by João Sanches and supervised by João Falcão. It was on this occasion that she moved from São Paulo to Rio de Janeiro. She also performed in the show "Gonzagão - A Lenda".

Laila began studying theater at age 11 and singing lyrical at age 13. At the age of 15, she was part of an amateur theater group at Casa Via Magia, and performed in plays such as "Romeo & Juliet and Caetano", with fragments of Shakespeare's work and songs by composer, "A Casa de Eros" (1996), "Medeia" (1997), "Roberto Zucco" (1998) and "Lábaro Estrelado" (1999).

In 2015, the actress was climbed to the novel of the nine, "Babilônia", exhibited by Rede Globo. In the plot, she lived Maria José, the wife of a corrupt politician. Laila also did a part in the series "Louco por Elas", also of Rede Globo.

Laila gained an international audience when she appeared in the popular Netflix Sci-fi series "3%" (2016) as the character Marcela Álvarez.

In January 2022, she released a single with Chico César, "Vermelho Esperança", written by him and taken off the soundtrack for the theater play A hora da estrela – O canto de Macabéa, which happened in 2020 and was inspired by Clarice Lispector's Hour of the Star.

Personal life 
In 2013, she married the French theater illuminator Hugo Mercier.

Filmography

Television

Film

Theater

Awards and nominations

References

External links
 

1978 births
Living people
People from Salvador, Bahia
Brazilian people of French descent
Brazilian television actresses
Brazilian film actresses
Brazilian stage actresses
21st-century Brazilian singers
21st-century Brazilian women singers